McMullen is a town in Pickens County, Alabama, United States. The population was 10 at the 2010 census, down from 66 in 2000. It incorporated around 1976. A series of natural disasters has caused the population to dwindle. As of 2010, it was the smallest incorporated town in the state of Alabama. It was overtaken by Oak Hill in 2020. The population was 32 at the 2020 United States census, up from 10 in 2010.

Geography

Demographics

2020 census

As of the 2020 United States census, there were 32 people, 6 households, and 0 families residing in the town.

2010 census
At the 2010 census, there were 10 people living in the town. 60% were African American, 10% White, and 30% were Hispanic or Latino.

2000 census
At the 2000 census, there were 66 people, 31 households, and 19 families living in the town. The racial makeup of the town was 100.00% African American.

Of the 31 households 16.1% had children under the age of 18 living with them, 32.3% were married couples living together, 29.0% had a female householder with no husband present, and 38.7% were non-families. 38.7% of households were one person and 12.9% were one person aged 65 or older. The average household size was 2.13 and the average family size was 2.74.

The age distribution was 19.7% under the age of 18, 6.1% from 18 to 24, 25.8% from 25 to 44, 22.7% from 45 to 64, and 25.8% 65 or older. The median age was 44 years. For every 100 females, there were 53.5 males. For every 100 females age 18 and over, there were 51.4 males.

The median household income was $30,000 and the median family income  was $33,500. Males had a median income of $21,250 versus $16,250 for females. The per capita income for the town was $10,458. There were 8.3% of families and 13.4% of the population living below the poverty line, including 10.0% of under eighteens and 4.3% of those over 64.

References

Towns in Pickens County, Alabama
Towns in Alabama
Populated places established in 1976